In Theron v The Master (2001), an important case in the South African law of succession, Mr and Mrs Theron were married in community of property. Mr Theron died and left certain property to his grandson in a trust. Mr Theron's son was appointed as the trustee, and had signed the will as a witness. Mrs Theron sought an order declaring that their son could benefit from the will (i.e. be appointed the trustee) despite signing as a witness.

The court considered the facts and held that the testator was not defrauded or unduly influenced; therefore the deceased's son was competent to be appointed as the trustee of the trust, despite having signed as a witness.

See also 
 Law of succession in South Africa

References 
 Theron and Another v Master of the High Court [2001] 3 All SA 507 (NC).

Notes 

Law of succession in South Africa
2001 in South African law
2001 in case law
South African case law